Artyom Samsonov may refer to:

 Artyom Samsonov (footballer, born 1989), Russian footballer
 Artyom Samsonov (footballer, born 1994), Russian footballer